Heritage Hills High School is a public high school located in Lincoln City, Indiana, United States. It serves students in grades 9-12 for the North Spencer School Corporation.

History 
The board of trustees of the North Spencer County School Corporation selected the name for a new high school in November 1971. Heritage Hills High School in Lincoln City, Indiana, was established in 1972, combining Dale High School with Chrisney High School. Students from Dale and Chisney merged in the new building that opened in January 1973 and was dedicated in November that year.

The school was built on part of the land grant originally owned by Thomas and Nancy Hanks Lincoln.

In 1997, the school board hired Construction Control Inc., of Fort Wayne, to manage renovation and construction at Heritage Hills, including construction of a middle school as well as complete renovation of the existing high school and industrial arts buildings and remodeling of the school's athletic facilities. Early estimates of costs exceeding $13.5 million were revised to $12.5 million once the design phase was completed. Work began in March 1999, and according to Superintendent Ron Etienne, the original building had few permanent walls to accommodate an "open classroom" concept of school design, a concept out of favor more than two decades later. In 2001, renovations and remodeling were completed.

In May 2020, long-time principal Nick Alcorn was honored on his retirement, following 32 years at Heritage Hills. The new administration includes Principal Jeff Cochren, Assistant Principal since 2009, and newly hired Assistant Principal Kate Kress.

Curriculum 
Three diplomas are offered: Indiana Core 40, Core 40 with academic honors, and Core 40 with technical honors. The state's Core 40 Curriculum was implemented beginning with the class of 2009, requiring more specific academic coursework in quantitative reasoning and language arts. Advance Placement and Career Technical courses are also offered, as well as articulation agreements for transfer coursework with Ivy Tech Community College and Vincennes University.

Heritage High is accredited by the North Central Association of Colleges and Schools.

Demographics 
The demographic breakdown of the 601 students enrolled for 2018-19 was:
Male - 51.2%
Female - 48.8%
Asian - 0.4%
Black - 1.0%
Hispanic - 7.3%
White - 90.3%
Multiracial - 0.8%
Unknown - 0.2%
46.3% of the students were eligible for free or reduced-cost lunch. For 2018-19, Heritage Hills was a Title I school.

Notable alumni
 Terry Brahm – Olympic long-distance runner
 Jay Cutler – National Football League (NFL) quarterback
 Ken Dilger – NFL tight end
 Bruce King – NFL fullback

See also
 List of high schools in Indiana

References

External links

School district

 

Public high schools in Indiana
High schools in Southwestern Indiana
Pocket Athletic Conference
Educational institutions established in 1972
Schools in Spencer County, Indiana
1972 establishments in Indiana